Hoot Mon! is a 1919 American silent comedy film featuring Stan Laurel.

Cast
 Bunny Bixby
 Harry Clifton
 Caroline Fowler
 Wallace Howe
 Bud Jamison
 Marie Joslyn
 Jerome Laplauch
 Stan Laurel
 Gus Leonard
 Belle Mitchell
 Marie Mosquini
 James Parrott
 William Petterson
 Lillian Rothchild
 Emmy Wallace
 Dorothea Wolbert
 Noah Young

See also
 List of American films of 1919

References

External links

1919 films
1919 comedy films
1919 short films
Silent American comedy films
American silent short films
American black-and-white films
Films directed by Hal Roach
American comedy short films
1910s American films